Chek Nai Ping is a village in Sha Tin District, Hong Kong.

Administration
Chek Nai Ping is a recognized village under the New Territories Small House Policy.

History
At the time of the 1911 census, the population of Chek Nai Ping was 122. The number of males was 70.

See also
 Kau Yeuk (Sha Tin)

References

External links

 Delineation of area of existing village Chek Nai Ping (Sha Tin) for election of resident representative (2019 to 2022)

Villages in Sha Tin District, Hong Kong